The Krag–Jørgensen pistol is a semi-automatic pistol of Norwegian origin. The weapon is from the same maker of the bolt-action rifles.

References

9mm Parabellum semi-automatic pistols
Firearms articles needing expert attention
Firearms of Norway